Richard A. Peterson may refer to:

 Richard A. Peterson (aviator) (1923-2000), American fighter pilot and architect
 Richard A. Peterson (sociologist) (1932–2010), American sociologist at Vanderbilt University